Betty Linderoth, née Cedergren (Stockholm, 13 February 1822 – Stockholm, 10 December 1900), was a Swedish watchmaker. 

Betty Linderoth was the daughter of a watchmaker and educated as her father's apprentice and Journeyman. When she was mocked by her fellow students as a "watchmaker in skirts", she dressed in trousers and cut her hair. In 1844, she married the watchmaker Gustaf Vilhelm Linderoth (d. 1871) and became the master of his business in Stockholm. She studied in Paris and Switzerland and was later given the task to regularly perform the maintenance of the clocks of the customers. Among her customers were the queen, Josephine of Leuchtenberg, and Princess Eugenie of Sweden. The Linderoth company had the task to construct the clocks of the nations railway stations, which were in fact made by her.  

Betty Linderoth was appointed watchmaker to the court of Oscar II of Sweden and honorary member of the Stockholm Watchmaker Society (1889) and the Watchmaker Society of Sweden (1892). She as well as her spouse were awarded at the 1862 International Exhibition, in her case the first Swedish female watchmaker to have received such an award.

References
 Wilhelmina Stålberg: Anteckningar om svenska qvinnor (1864)
 Idun nr 23 years 1894

Further reading 
 

1822 births
1900 deaths
Swedish watchmakers (people)
Swedish clockmakers
19th-century Swedish businesspeople
Swedish women artisans
19th-century Swedish businesswomen